Khaled Zamzamnejad is an Iranian reformist politician from western Hormozgan Province. He was formerly a member of city council of Port Lengeh.

2016 election
In 2016 Iranian legislative election, Zamzamnejad defeated incumbent Ahmad Jabbari in Lengeh, Bastak and Parsian counties in a two-rounds race. On 19 May 2016, the Guardian Council declared that the second round elections is voided and the representative would by elected in a by-election. No reason was given for the decision objected by Zamzamnejad.

See also
Minoo Khaleghi
Beytollah Abdollahi

References

Living people
People from Hormozgan Province
1969 births
Iranian reformists
Iranian elected officials who did not take office